Samuel Wright (born 6 December 1933) is a Jamaican cricketer. He played in one first-class match for the Jamaican cricket team in 1958/59.

See also
 List of Jamaican representative cricketers

References

External links
 

1933 births
Living people
Jamaican cricketers
Jamaica cricketers
People from Saint Elizabeth Parish